WKQV (105.5 FM, "105 KQV") is a Classic rock formatted broadcast radio station licensed to Cowen, West Virginia, serving the Richwood/Summersville area.  WKQV is owned and operated by Summit Media Broadcasting, LLC.

Translators
WKQV programming is simulcast on a broadcast translator to extend and improve its signal coverage area.

External links
WKQV official website

KQV
Classic rock radio stations in the United States